REMA 1000-ligaen is the premier women's professional handball league for Norwegian handball clubs. It is administered by the Norwegian Handball Federation, and the winners are recognized as Norwegian champions. It was established in 1968, and it is currently contested by thirteen teams. Larvik HK, which has dominated the competition in recent years, is the championship's most successful team with nineteen titles, followed by IL Vestar with nine, and Byåsen IL and Vipers Kristiansand, both with five.

Currently the winner of the championship play-offs is granted a spot in the EHF Champions League's group stage.

The twelve teams of the 2022/23 season. Vipers Kristiansand is the defending champion.

Starting 2023/2024-season, the league will consist of 14 teams.

List of champions
The complete list of the Norwegian handball champions since 1968.

List of topscorers

Statistics

EHF coefficients

The following data indicates Norwegian coefficient rankings between European handball leagues.

Country ranking
EHF League Ranking for 2022/23 season:

1.  (1)  Nemzeti Bajnokság I (157.67)
2.  (5)   Ligue Butagaz Énergie (118.50) 
3.  (2)  Russian Superleague (114.50) 
4.  (3)  Kvindeligaen (109.00)
5.  (6)  REMA 1000-ligaen (102.77)
6.  (4)  Liga Națională (94.50)

In European competitions

Names of the competition
 1967–1975: Hovedserien
 1975-1993: 1. divisjon
 1993–2000: Eliteserien i håndball 
 2000–2005: Gildeserien
 2005–2007: Eliteserien
 2007–2014: Postenligaen, after Posten Norge
 2014–2017: GRUNDIGligaen, after Grundig
 2017–2019: Eliteserien
 2019–: REMA 1000-ligaen, after REMA 1000

See also

 Norway women's national handball team
 Norwegian Women's Handball Cup

References

Notes

External links
 Norges Håndballforbund

Handball competitions in Norway
Women's handball leagues
Norway
Sports leagues established in 1968
1968 establishments in Norway
Women's handball in Norway
Women's sports leagues in Norway
Professional sports leagues in Norway